The 2016 NCAA Division I FBS football season was the highest level of college football competition in the United States organized by the National Collegiate Athletic Association (NCAA). The regular season began on August 26, 2016 and ended on December 10, 2016. The postseason concluded on January 9, 2017 with the 2017 College Football Playoff National Championship, where the Clemson Tigers defeated the Alabama Crimson Tide to claim their second national title in school history. The championship game was a rematch of the 2016 edition won by Alabama.

Rule changes
The following rule changes were voted on by the NCAA Football Rules Committee for the 2016 season:

 Requiring replay officials to review all aspects of targeting penalties, including the option to call a targeting foul missed by the on-field officials if the foul is deemed egregious. After several hits during the early part of the season that resulted in concussions that should have been targeting, the NCAA Rules Committee reinforced this rule for replay officials and also clarified the "crown of the helmet" (to determine targeting penalties) as the area above the facemask to the dome of the helmet.
 Allowing electronic devices to be used for coaching purposes in the press box and locker room during the game. Electronic devices will still be prohibited on the field and sideline.
 Coaches can now be ejected after receiving two unsportsmanlike conduct penalties in one game, the same as players.
 A ball carrier who "gives himself up" (e.g., by sliding) will now be considered a defenseless player.
 Deliberate tripping of a ball carrier with the leg is now a 15-yard penalty.
 Players who leave the tackle box are now prohibited from blocking below the waist toward the initial position of the ball.
 An exception to a rule introduced for the 2015 season regarding low hits to passers (i.e., at or below the knee) was eliminated. Previously, a defensive player would not have been penalized for such a hit if making a bona fide attempt at a tackle.
 Teams attempting a scrimmage kick (i.e., field goals, PATs, and punts) must have five offensive linemen (numbered 50-79) on the scrimmage line unless the kicking team has at least two players seven yards OR one player at least 10 yards behind the line of scrimmage. Previously, only one player had to be lined up seven yards behind the line to avoid using five linemen, causing confusion in kick coverage on defense.
 The procedure for restarting the game clock following a penalty by the offense will change if the penalized team has a lead in the last two minutes of either half. Before this season, the game clock would have been restarted in this situation once the ball was declared ready for play; it now will not start until the ball is snapped.

The committee, once again, took no action on changing the ineligible receiver downfield rule from three yards to one yard; however it will once again be a "point of emphasis" and will adjust officiating mechanics to better officiate those plays.

Conference realignment

Membership changes

Although Coastal Carolina began the transition process to FBS in the 2016 season and joined the Sun Belt Conference in non-football sports, it was officially classified as an FCS independent for this first season of the transition. Coastal Carolina became a provisional FBS member when the football team joined the Sun Belt in 2017, and full FBS membership and bowl eligibility followed in 2018.

Other headlines

 March 1 – The Sun Belt Conference announced that its football-only membership agreements with Idaho and New Mexico State would not be renewed upon their expirations at the end of the 2017 season.
 March 3 - The NCAA Council forced the University of Louisiana at Lafayette and the Louisiana-Lafayette Ragin' Cajuns football team to vacate 22 wins from 2011-2014 including the 2011 and 2014 New Orleans Bowl championships after a finding that a previous assistant head coach had falsified ACT scores. Their penalty was the lowest penalty in NCAA Division I and the university did not receive a post-season ban.
 April 8 – The NCAA Division I Council voted to prohibit FBS schools from participating in or conducting so-called "satellite camps." The new rule was reversed on April 28.
 April 11 – The Division I Council approved a three-year moratorium on new bowl games, following a season in which a record three teams with sub-.500 records made bowls. No new bowls were allowed until the 2019 season. This decision affected three games that were in the process of seeking NCAA certification for the 2016 season.
 April 28
 The University of Idaho announced that the Vandals football team would return to the FCS Big Sky Conference, its all-sports league, effective with the 2018 season. The Vandals became the first team ever to voluntarily drop from FBS to FCS.
 The Division I Board of Directors rescinded the FBS satellite camp ban that had been approved less than three weeks earlier. The ban had sparked major controversy within several conferences, notably the Pac-12 (whose Division I Council representative voted for the ban despite 11 of the league's 12 members opposing it). Additionally, the ban was seen as having the unintended effect of limiting scholarship opportunities, especially at Group of Five schools, for a large number of high school prospects.
 September 10 - Arizona State running back Kalen Ballage scored 8 touchdowns in the Sun Devils' 68–55 win over Texas Tech, tying an NCAA record set in 1990 by Howard Griffith of Illinois against Southern Illinois.
 October 22 – The Oklahoma–Texas Tech game, won 66–59 by Oklahoma, saw several FBS single-game records broken or equaled:
 The teams combined for 1,708 yards of total offense (854 each), surpassing the previous FBS record of 1,640 set by San Jose State and Nevada in 2001.
 Texas Tech quarterback Patrick Mahomes' 819 yards of total offense broke the previous FBS record of 751 set in 2014 by Connor Halliday of Washington State. Mahomes also tied Halliday's FBS record of 734 passing yards.
 Oklahoma became the first FBS team ever with a 500-yard passer (Baker Mayfield), 200-yard rusher (Joe Mixon), and 200-yard receiver (Dede Westbrook) in a single game.
 November 9 – Georgia State University received final approval from the Georgia Board of Regents, the governing body of the state's university system, to purchase Turner Field, vacated by the Atlanta Braves after their 2016 season. The facility, originally the main stadium of the 1996 Olympics, was converted to a football stadium seating 23,000, with potential future expansion to 33,000. The football team ultimately began play at Turner Field, now known as Center Parc Stadium, in 2017 while the conversion project was ongoing.
 November 26 – Pittsburgh defeated Syracuse 76–61, with the two teams setting a new FBS record for combined points scored in a regulation game. The previous record had been set by Navy and North Texas in 2007.

Kickoff games

California and Hawaii played the first game of the 2016 season at ANZ Stadium in Sydney, Australia on August 27. This was the first college football game in Oceania since 1985. California eased to a 51–31 win.
Boston College and Georgia Tech played at Aviva Stadium in Dublin, Ireland on September 3, in a game billed as the Aer Lingus College Football Classic. Georgia Tech scored a touchdown in the last minute to win 17–14.
Wisconsin hosted LSU at the first-ever Division I FBS game at Lambeau Field in Green Bay, Wisconsin, also on September 3. The Badgers surprised the No. 5 Tigers 16–14. AP reporter Genaro Armas wrote that the loss, the first in a season opener for Les Miles in his 12 seasons at LSU, "will surely put Miles back on the hot seat after he was nearly run out of Baton Rouge after a 9–3 season in 2015."
Houston met Oklahoma at NRG Stadium in Houston on September 3 in the Texas Kickoff, a game with major College Football Playoff significance as a virtual elimination game for Houston as a CFP contender. The Cougars are members of the "Group of Five" American Athletic Conference, but were coming off a convincing win over Florida State in last season's Peach Bowl. The game was also played against the backdrop of potential Big 12 Conference expansion, with Houston seen by many in the media as a leading Big 12 candidate. The Cougars won 33–23.
North Carolina and Georgia played at the Georgia Dome in Atlanta, Georgia on September 3, in the annual Chick-fil-A Kickoff Game. Both teams entered the contest 0–1 in the Chick-fil-A Kickoff Game, with North Carolina losing to LSU in 2010 and Georgia falling to Boise State in 2011. In the debut for Georgia head coach Kirby Smart, the Bulldogs won 33–24, led by Nick Chubb, who ran for 222 yards and two touchdowns in his first game since tearing an ACL last season.
USC and Alabama played at AT&T Stadium in Arlington, Texas on September 3 in the Advocare Classic. Defending national champions Alabama blasted the Trojans 52–6, marking USC's worst loss since a 51–0 blowout by Notre Dame in 1966.
Arizona and BYU played week 1 of the season at University of Phoenix Stadium in Glendale, Arizona on September 3 in the Cactus Kickoff. BYU won 18–16 on a field goal with 4 seconds left.
Ole Miss and Florida State played at Camping World Stadium in Orlando, Florida on September 5 in the Camping World Kickoff. Florida State, facing a 28–6 second-quarter deficit, scored 33 unanswered points and went on to win 45–34.
Virginia Tech and Tennessee played at Bristol Motor Speedway near Bristol, Tennessee on September 10 in a game billed as the Pilot Flying J Battle at Bristol. The game drew an announced crowd of 156,990, breaking the previous record for a college football game by more than 40,000. After trailing 14–0 at the end of the first quarter, Tennessee scored 31 unanswered points en route to a 45–24 win.

Regular season top 10 matchups
Rankings reflect the AP Poll. Rankings for Week 10 and beyond will list College Football Playoff Rankings first and AP Poll second. Teams that fail to be a top 10 team for one poll or the other will be noted.

Week 3
No. 10 Louisville defeated No. 2 Florida State 63–20 (Papa John's Cardinal Stadium, Louisville, Kentucky)
Week 5
No. 10 Washington defeated No. 7 Stanford 44–6 (Husky Stadium, Seattle, Washington)
No. 5 Clemson defeated No. 3 Louisville 42–36 (Clemson Memorial Stadium, Clemson, South Carolina)
No. 4 Michigan defeated No. 8 Wisconsin 14–7 (Michigan Stadium, Ann Arbor, Michigan)
Week 6
No. 8 Texas A&M defeated No. 9 Tennessee 45–38, 2OT (Kyle Field, College Station, Texas)
Week 7
No. 1 Alabama defeated No. 9 Tennessee 49–10 (Neyland Stadium, Knoxville, Tennessee)
No. 2 Ohio State defeated No. 8 Wisconsin 30–23, OT (Camp Randall Stadium, Madison, Wisconsin)
Week 8
No. 1 Alabama defeated No. 6 Texas A&M 33–14 (Bryant-Denny Stadium, Tuscaloosa, Alabama)
Week 10
No. 6/6 Ohio State defeated No. 10/9 Nebraska 62–3 (Ohio Stadium, Columbus, Ohio)
Week 12
No. 9/8 Oklahoma defeated No. 14/10 West Virginia 56–28 (Milan Puskar Stadium, Morgantown, West Virginia)
Week 13
No. 2/2 Ohio State defeated No. 3/3 Michigan 30–27, 2OT (Ohio Stadium, Columbus, Ohio)
Week 14
No. 4/4 Washington defeated No. 8/9 Colorado 41–10 (2016 Pac-12 Championship Game, Levi's Stadium, Santa Clara, California)
No. 7/8 Penn State defeated No. 6/6 Wisconsin 38–31 (2016 Big 10 Championship Game, Lucas Oil Stadium, Indianapolis, Indiana)

Upsets
In the first full weekend of the season, seven teams ranked in the AP Poll lost, the most in an opening week since the debut of the AP preseason poll in 1950. The seven ranked losers included two top-five teams; the last time two such teams had lost in the season's first week was 1972. The weekend also saw seven SEC teams lose their season openers, which had not happened since the league returned to 12 teams with the 1992 arrival of Arkansas and South Carolina. One of those loses saw South Alabama defeat Mississippi State 21-20 as a 28-point underdog, which was the biggest FPI upset in the last 5 seasons (2.3% chance to win before the match).

On September 10, a finish noted for its improbability happened when Central Michigan defeated Oklahoma State 30–27 on a Hail Mary pass followed by a lateral on the game's final play. Shortly afterwards, the game officials, as well as the conferences of the participating teams (the MAC and Big 12 respectively), announced that Central Michigan should not have been allowed to run the winning play. On the previous play, during which the clock had run out, Oklahoma State had been called for intentional grounding on fourth down. Under NCAA rules, a game cannot end on an accepted live ball foul; however, an exception to that rule states that if the penalty includes a loss of down—which is the case for intentional grounding—the game ends at that point.

On September 17, FCS program North Dakota State defeated No. 13 Iowa on a late field goal to win 23–21 at Kinnick Stadium, becoming just the fourth FCS team to beat an AP-ranked FBS team. This was Iowa's first loss to a non FBS opponent. The next day, NDSU received 74 points in the AP Poll to set a new record for votes received by an FCS team in a single AP Poll.

On October 22, unranked Penn State defeated No. 2 Ohio State, 24-21 at Beaver Stadium. Penn State had not been ranked since the 2011 season, and had entered the 2016 season still rebuilding after sanctions had decimated the roster in 2012. Ohio State built a 21-7 lead in the third quarter; Penn State rallied to score the game's final 17 points. Ohio State had lined up for a field goal to potentially put them ahead by seven points, but then-safety Marcus Allen blocked the field goal attempt, and Penn State's cornerback Grant Haley returned it 60 yards for the score. Haley's game-winning touchdown was labeled as the "Kick Six". It was Penn State's first win over a Top-5 team in 20 years; their first win against a top-2 opponent since 1990; and their first win in Beaver Stadium against a team ranked No. 2 since 1982 against No. 2 Nebraska. Penn State would go on to win nine straight games, winning the Big Ten Championship, rose to No. 5 in the College Football Playoff rankings, and went to the Rose Bowl. Ohio State did not lose again during the regular season, and despite their loss to Penn State, they would go on to the College Football Playoff.

On December 10, Army defeated No. 25 ranked Navy 21–17 to end a 14-year losing streak in the Army–Navy Game, the longest for either side in the rivalry's history.

Updated stadiums
Miami (FL) debuted major renovations to the renamed Hard Rock Stadium. In a project that began after the Hurricanes and the stadium's owner, the Miami Dolphins, completed their 2014 seasons, a canopy was added over the main seating areas, video boards were placed in each corner, many luxury suites and club seats were added, and the stadium's lower bowl was reconstructed, eliminating an obsolete movable stand that had been added in the early 1990s to accommodate Major League Baseball's Florida (now Miami) Marlins. The capacity was reduced from over 75,000 to slightly over 65,000. 
Utah State made major renovations to Maverik Stadium, adding a new complex to the west side featuring expanded concourses, luxury suites, and a new press box.
Oklahoma is currently undertaking a $160 million renovation of the south end zone of Gaylord Family Oklahoma Memorial Stadium. The renovation which will bowl in the end zone includes 22 enclosed suites, 60 loge boxes and nearly 2,000 club seats. The new end zone when completed will be topped by a new state of the art 7,806 square feet scoreboard. The official capacity increased to 83,489 (from 82,112).
Ole Miss  debuted phase 2 of the latest renovations and expansion of Vaught–Hemingway Stadium. The 2016 season saw the opening of new seating bowls in the north end zone, bringing capacity to 64,038.
Florida State unveiled The Champions Club, a new club seat section constructed for Doak Campbell Stadium. The exclusive 6,000-seat club seat section, with more than 70,000 square feet of air conditioned club space and 34,000 square feet of covered rooftop terraces, was built in the south end zone across from the Unconquered Statue.
Arizona State began a four-year renovation of Sun Devil Stadium after the 2014 season. For the 2016 season, upper deck seats were removed and the lower bowl on the west sideline and north end zone was redone. Renovations are expected to be complete by the start of the 2018 season.
West Virginia was in the midst of approximately $50 million in renovations to Milan Puskar Stadium. For this season, the old turf and goalposts were replaced, and the crown under the field was removed and a modern base and drainage system installed that is more in keeping with today's infilled artificial turf systems. Also, work on the east and north side gates and concourses, including renovations to concessions, restrooms, and additional space for EMS and police operations, was completed for the 2016 season. Similar work on the west and south sides of the stadium is ongoing and expected to be completed for 2017.
Louisville began work on expansion of Papa John's Cardinal Stadium during the season. The project will increase the stadium's capacity from 55,000 to 65,000, and at the time was planned to be complete for the 2019 season. Due to unexpected fundraising success, the project timetable was advanced, and the expansion is now expected to open for the 2018 season.

In addition to the stadium updates above, two schools played their final season in their then-current venues:
 Colorado State was in the process of replacing Hughes Stadium, owned by the university but located about 4 miles (6 km) west of the main campus, with a new on-campus venue tentatively known as Colorado State Stadium. The new stadium opened for the 2017 season.
 Georgia State played its final season in the Georgia Dome, as the stadium was to be demolished once its replacement, Mercedes-Benz Stadium, opened in September 2017. As noted above, Georgia State purchased Turner Field with the intent of renovating the stadium for football, and the Panthers began playing home games there in 2017 while renovations were ongoing.

Conference standings

Conference summaries
Rankings reflect the Week 15 AP Poll before the conference championship games were played.

Power 5 Conferences

Group of Five Conferences
CFP College Football Playoff participant

Postseason

Bowl selections
There were 40 postseason bowl games, with two teams advancing to a 41st – the CFP National Championship game. As in previous seasons, teams with losing records could become bowl-eligible in order to fill all 80 bowl slots.

Bowl-eligible teams
American Athletic Conference (7): Houston, Memphis, Navy, Temple, Tulsa, UCF, USF
Atlantic Coast Conference (11): Boston College, Clemson, Florida State, Georgia Tech, Louisville, Miami, N.C. State, North Carolina, Pittsburgh, Virginia Tech, Wake Forest 
Big 12 Conference (6): Baylor, Kansas State, Oklahoma, Oklahoma State, TCU, West Virginia
Big Ten Conference (10): Indiana, Iowa, Maryland, Michigan, Minnesota, Nebraska, Northwestern, Ohio State, Penn State, Wisconsin
Conference USA (7): Louisiana Tech, Middle Tennessee, Old Dominion, North Texas*, Southern Miss, UTSA, Western Kentucky
Independents (2): Army, BYU
Mid-American Conference (6): Central Michigan, Eastern Michigan, Miami (OH), Ohio, Toledo, Western Michigan
Mountain West Conference (7): Air Force, Boise State, Colorado State, Hawaii*, New Mexico, San Diego State, Wyoming
Pac-12 Conference (6): Colorado, Stanford, USC, Utah, Washington, Washington State
Southeastern Conference (12): Alabama, Arkansas, Auburn, Florida, Georgia, Kentucky, LSU, Mississippi State*, South Carolina, Tennessee, Texas A&M, Vanderbilt
Sun Belt Conference (6): Appalachian State, Arkansas State, Idaho, Louisiana-Lafayette, South Alabama, Troy

Teams with Asterisk(*) qualified for bowls based on Academic Progress Rate, despite not having a bowl-eligible record.

Number of bowl berths available: 80

Number of bowl-eligible teams: 80

Bowl-ineligible teams

The American (5): SMU, Cincinnati, Connecticut, East Carolina, Tulane
ACC (3): Duke, Syracuse, Virginia
Big Ten (4): Illinois, Michigan State, Purdue, Rutgers
Big 12 (4): Texas, Texas Tech, Iowa State, Kansas
Conference USA (6): Charlotte, Florida Atlantic, Florida International, Marshall, Rice, UTEP
Independent (2): Notre Dame, Massachusetts
MAC (6): Akron, Northern Illinois, Ball State, Bowling Green, Buffalo, Kent State
Mountain West (5): Nevada, Fresno State, San Jose State, Utah State, UNLV
Pac-12 (6): Arizona State, California, Arizona, Oregon, Oregon State, UCLA
SEC (2): Missouri, Ole Miss
Sun Belt (5): Georgia Southern, Louisiana–Monroe, Georgia State, New Mexico State, Texas State

Number of bowl-ineligible teams: 48

Conference performance in bowl games

College Football Playoff 
Since the 2014–15 postseason, six College Football Playoff (CFP) bowl games have hosted two semifinal playoff games on a rotating basis. For the 2016 season, the Fiesta Bowl and the Peach Bowl hosted the semifinal games, with the winners advancing to the 2017 College Football Playoff National Championship at Raymond James Stadium in Tampa, Florida.

Rankings

Final CFP rankings

Final rankings

Awards and honors

Heisman Trophy
The Heisman Trophy is given to the year's most outstanding player.

Lamar Jackson (QB), Louisville
Baker Mayfield (QB), Oklahoma
Jabrill Peppers (LB), Michigan
Deshaun Watson (QB), Clemson
Dede Westbrook (WR), Oklahoma

Other overall
Archie Griffin Award (MVP): Sam Darnold, USC
AP Player of the Year: Lamar Jackson, Louisville
Chic Harley Award (Player of the Year): Deshaun Watson, Clemson
Maxwell Award (top player): Lamar Jackson, Louisville
SN Player of the Year: Lamar Jackson, Louisville
Walter Camp Award (top player): Lamar Jackson, Louisville

Special overall
Burlsworth Trophy (top player who began as walk-on): Baker Mayfield, Oklahoma
Paul Hornung Award (most versatile player): Jabrill Peppers, Michigan
Campbell Trophy ("academic Heisman"): Zach Terrell, Western Michigan
Wuerffel Trophy (humanitarian-athlete): Trevor Knight, Texas A&M
POLY POY (Polynesian College Football Player of the Year): Sefo Liufau, Colorado

Offense
Quarterback

Davey O'Brien Award (quarterback): Deshaun Watson, Clemson
Johnny Unitas Award (senior/4th year quarterback): Deshaun Watson, Clemson
Kellen Moore Award (quarterback): Baker Mayfield, Oklahoma
Manning Award (quarterback): Deshaun Watson, Clemson
Sammy Baugh Trophy (passing quarterback): Patrick Mahomes II, Texas Tech

Running back

Doak Walker Award (running back): D'Onta Foreman, Texas
Jim Brown Trophy (running back): Donnel Pumphrey, San Diego State

Receiver

Fred Biletnikoff Award (outstanding receiver at any position): Dede Westbrook, Oklahoma
Paul Warfield Trophy (wide receiver): Finalists: Corey Davis, Western Michigan

Tight end

John Mackey Award (tight end): Jake Butt, Michigan
Ozzie Newsome Award (tight end): Evan Engram, Ole Miss

Lineman

Dave Rimington Trophy (center): Pat Elflein, Ohio State
Jim Parker Trophy (offensive lineman): Pat Elflein, Ohio State
 Joe Moore Award (offensive line): Iowa

Defense
 Bronko Nagurski Trophy (defensive player): Jonathan Allen, Alabama 
 Chuck Bednarik Award (defensive player): Jonathan Allen, Alabama
Lott Trophy (defensive impact): Jabrill Peppers, Michigan

Defensive line

Bill Willis Award (defensive lineman): Ed Oliver, Houston
Dick Butkus Award (linebacker): Reuben Foster, Alabama
Jack Lambert Trophy (linebacker): Ben Boulware, Clemson
Lombardi Award (defensive lineman/linebacker): Jonathan Allen, Alabama
Ted Hendricks Award (defensive end): Jonathan Allen, Alabama

Defensive back

Jim Thorpe Award (defensive back): Adoree' Jackson, USC
Jack Tatum Trophy (defensive back): Tarvarus McFadden, Florida State

Special teams
Lou Groza Award (placekicker): Zane Gonzalez, Arizona State
Vlade Award (placekicker): Tyler Davis, Penn State
Ray Guy Award (punter): Mitch Wishnowsky, Utah
Jet Award (return specialist): Adoree' Jackson, USC
Peter Mortell Award (holder): Garrett Moores, Michigan

Other positional awards
Outland Trophy (interior lineman on either offense or defense): Cam Robinson, Alabama

Coaches
AFCA Coach of the Year: Mike MacIntyre, Colorado
AP Coach of the Year: Mike MacIntyre, Colorado

Assistants
AFCA Assistant Coach of the Year: Dan Brooks, Clemson
Broyles Award: Brent Venables, Clemson

All-Americans

Coaching changes

Preseason and in-season
This is restricted to coaching changes taking place on or after May 1, 2016. For coaching changes that occurred earlier in 2016, see 2015 NCAA Division I FBS end-of-season coaching changes.

End of season

Television viewers and ratings

Most watched regular season games

Conference championship games

College Football Playoff

Attendance

See also

 2016 NCAA Division I FBS football rankings
 2016 NCAA Division I FCS football season
 2016 NCAA Division II football season
 2016 NCAA Division III football season
 2016 NAIA football season

Footnotes

References

External links